Homosexuality in Sri Lanka consists of males who have homosexual sex with other males on the island-state of Sri Lanka. It also references the history of homosexual sex on the island during its history as Ceylon and as part of various continental kingdoms during pre-colonial times.

Human rights and legalities

Penal Code 

The sections 365 and 365A proscribe that any unnatural offences or acts of gross indecency between persons should be punished with "rigorous imprisonment for a term not less than 10 years and not exceeding twenty years with a fine and compensation".

Vagrants Ordinance 

The section 07 of 1841 criminalizes soliciting and acts of indecency in public places, with a punishment of no more than six months and a fine of 100 rupees.

History 
Homosexuality has been in literature and artwork for several thousands of years. It is thought that homosexual sex was not looked down upon until the 16th century with the arrival of missionaries from Europe who promoted their religious values that forbade homosexual sex and eventually imposed laws criminalizing homosexual sex under colonialism.

Efforts during the post-colonial era to support sexual minorities increased in the 21st century.

Lanka 
The concept of homosexuality was widely known in the prevailing Hindu culture by the time the Buddha founded his philosophies. The monastic discipline explicitly contained homosexual sex alongside a variety of prohibitions against heterosexual sex, and it also explicitly stated that these rules were to only be applied to monks and not the lay people. It is notable that masturbation is not considered a serious offense by the order.

Homosexuality was also not criminalized nor marginalized during the pre-colonial times of the island. The traditional legal codes of Lanka did not criminalize sexual minorities or actively discriminate against homosexuals.

In the 5th century of the Christian calendar, the monk Buddhaghosa attempted to explain what  was in his scriptures to Buddhist lay people. Other records simply stay silent on the subject;  for example, the Upāsakajanalankara, a guide for lay people written in the 14th century of the Christian calendar, discusses sexual misconduct in depth but makes no mention of homosexual sex.

The Tripitaka does, however, contain passing references to homosexuality and transsexuality. For example, homosexuality is found in the case of a monk, called Wakkali, who became a monk because he was so attracted to how handsome Buddha was. There is also a case where a novice monk masturbated to a high ordained monk.

Buddhism in Sri Lanka mostly focuses on sex on a non-discriminatory basis. It holds the view that sex is 'dirty' or 'immoral' and this is reflected in modern-day discussion about sex, including discussion on same-sex relations. The monastic rules state that monks should be celibate, but note that these rules do not extend to the lay people.

Ground Views shares the opinion that Sri Lanka without colonial influences would have probably held a similar culture to that of Thailand.

Ceylon

Christianity 
With the colonial expansion of European empires to the island, also came missionaries from the European church.

An observer in the 16th century, most likely a priest from the European church of ethnic European descent, claimed that “The sin of sodomy is so prevalent… that it makes us very afraid to live there. And if one of the principle men of the kingdom is questioned about if they are not ashamed to do such a thing as ugly and dirty, to this they respond that they do everything that they see the king doing, because that is the custom among them.”.

Englishman John Knox, who by this time had lived in the country for twenty years and spoke fluent Sinhala, wrote about the King of Kandy; “Most of his Attendants are Boyes, and Young Men, that are well favoured, and of good Parentage. For the supplying himself with these, he gives order to his Dissava’s or Governors of the countreys to pick and choose out Boyes, that are comely and of good Descent, and send them to the Court. These boyes go bare-headed with long hair hanging down their backs. Not that he is guilty of Sodomy, nor did I ever hear the Sin so much as mentioned among them.” It should, however, be noted that accusing someone of homosexuality would be degrading their character.

Sri Lanka 
The ethnic conflict on the island is often cited as a major reason why legal rights for sexual minorities did not progress with the same speed as other countries. Often political parties that focused on moderation and the 'middle path', emphasising the needs for human rights, would be sidelined in favor of political parties that supported extremist and nationalist politics.

Regardless of their sexuality, it is expected of the men to marry in adulthood.

The European Union has recently proposed to use its elevated trade deal negotiations to ensure that human rights on the island would be protected.

In November 2016, Sri Lanka voted against a plan to get rid of the UN Independent Expert on violence and discrimination based on sexual orientation and gender identity at the United Nations General Assembly. The push to get rid of the UN expert failed 84-77. Sri Lanka along with Kiribati were the only two countries, where homosexuality is still criminalised, who voted against the proposal.

The conservative government later announced that the Constitution of Sri Lanka bans discrimination based on sexual orientation. It also updated its human rights action plan to advance further rights for LGBT. It was consequently followed by an announcement from the Supreme Court of Sri Lanka that it would not be able to enforce the criminal law Section 365A if a case was brought before it.

In January 2017, cabinet members of the Sri Lankan government rejected the chance to legalize homosexuality. But in November, Deputy Solicitor General Nerin Pulle stated that the government would move to decriminalize same-sex sexual activity.

Culture 
There are a number of establishments aimed at homosexual men found in the greater Colombo region, notably in the Mount Lavinia area, home to the annual gay pride, and the city of Negombo, a former Dutch colony on the outskirts of Colombo, with few other establishments scattered across the island. A lot of the heterosexual establishments court homosexual customers and will fly the rainbow flag on gay pride day. It is reported that homosexual sex remains commonplace between younger men and at Buddhist temples. It is furthermore also widely reported that homosexual abuse of young children is also a problem among religious institutions.

Equal Ground reported that the media had become far more positive towards homosexuals since 2016, in both English and Sinhalese, rather than the more hostile media climate that much of the media participated in prior to this date; one of the most typical themes in Sri Lanka media was the association between homosexuality and pedophilia. A number of movies and literature works exist that discuss homosexuality though it still remains a small niche.

The Internet is the primary tool of communication for gays, with yahoo.com, gaydar.com, and gay.com being quite popular. 91% of gay men had lost their virginity by the age of 17. Facebook is also used to organise parties. 21% of LGBT in Sri Lanka reported that they were currently in a homosexual relationship with another male. Around 43% of sexual minorities in Sri Lanka report 'high life satisfaction' as opposed to 24% in Pakistan and 34% in India. 64% of LGBT polled were single and not in a relationship. At least 51% of LGBT were out to family, a number that is higher than the number out to friends and to their workplace. Around 46% stated that they share LGBTQ content openly on their social media profiles, with only 22% stating that they would never share such content on their own profiles.

Terminology 
Ekalingika Samsarga - Same-gender sex (homosexuality)

Tritiya Prakriti - Third Nature (n.b. does not equate to the third gender)

Galkapanava - Male homosexual sex (literally 'rock breaking)

As with much of Non-Muslim Asia, intercrural sex has been historically more associated with homosexuality than anal sex, and is basically consisting of rubbing the penis between the thighs or the buttocks or on the abdomen.

Dating and friendship preferences 
An informal survey found that the majority of sexual minorities in Sri Lanka found Westerners sexually desirable, finding them more 'sensual and sexually adept' than the locals; only around a quarter had had sex with a Westerner. None of those surveys had issues with dating someone from the opposite ethnolinguistic group, either Tamil or Sinhalese, but apart from one person, the majority expressed dislike for Muslims (including Moors) and did not like them as friends or sexual partners.

There is a preference for youth among the community, though social respect for the elderly can mean older people are also able to find sex.

A survey found that the locals considered their own ethnicities "to be the most beautiful men in the world" placing them above westerners, the latter who were viewed as more 'sensual and sexually adept' than the locals.

Social issues

Sexual violence 
Sri Lankan law does not recognize same-sex male rape according to a report published by the human rights organization at UCLA, and the UN has stated that Sri Lankan men are as likely as women to be the victim of rape. The majority of these reported rapes occur during detention by government forces, but it is also suggested that other non-governmental groups also engaged in sexual violence, and there are also no established channels for victims to report their rapes without fear of retribution or shame. According to the report by UCLA, "Despite evidence suggesting that sexual abuse of boys is common in the context of sex tourism, schools,care homes, religious establishments and other similar settings in Sri Lanka, and that male-on-male sexual violence outside such settings is also not uncommon, there is unwillingness to acknowledge the problem or the enormous shame and stigma associated with it, and a tendency to ignore or ridicule complainants."

It also wrote that a "2013 study by CARE International Sri Lanka on intimate partner violence and gender-based violence in four districts found that of the 1,658 male respondents in the study, 28 per cent reported that they had experienced sexual abuse during childhood. Additionally, 12.1 per cent of male participants reported having perpetrated sexual violence on men in the context of their membership in gangs... The CARE International study also found that sexual abuse of boys occurred in schools and universities in the context of “ragging” (verbal, physical or emotional abuse of newcomers to education institutions), and that three per cent of male respondents reported having been forced to have “sex or physical relations” with a community leader or schoolboy before the age of 18 years."

An issue remains with social stigma, as one activist put it; “Male survivors who share their experiences, experience stigma, ostracism, and a loss of social standing even among their closest and most sympathetic friends, and are re-victimised and further traumatised as a result of opening up about their experience and attempting to seek justice.”

Discrimination 
Gay men feel unable to openly complain about discrimination due to the social stigma attached to being homosexual, and this reflects the wider problem of homophobia on the island. Since the colonial period, lesbian, gay, bisexual, and transgender rights have remained static, and homosexuality is outlawed in Sri Lanka. As a result, there is no act of ‘coming out of the closet’ in Sri Lanka. Although male-to-male sexual contact has been shown to be frequent, with over two-thirds of males reporting having participated in this kind of sexual behaviour at some point in their lives, almost all gay men attempt to lead normal heterosexual lives due to constant pressure from society and the inability of most in society to understand the scientific explanation of homosexuality. Most people in society consider homosexuality to be a mental disorder that should be treated. As a result, because the majority of people in Sri Lanka think this is weird or unnatural, gay people are discriminated against every day.

Media 

Throughout Sri Lanka's new millennium, LGBTIQ organizations have encountered roadblocks as a result of ethno-nationalist politics and government-backed, homophobic reportage in the news media. The media’s perception and portrayal of gay men in Sri Lanka heavily influence public opinion. The media's coverage of homosexuality in Sri Lanka has mostly been negative, with a few exceptions.

Bollywood cinema, which is immensely popular in Sri Lanka, is well-known for portraying homosexuality in a bad light on a majority of occasions. Sri Lankans' creative expression may also be influenced by this. This has resulted in many Sri Lankan movies and teledramas including gay men simply as comic elements in their work. Aside from political, legal, and communal initiatives, various films on homosexuality and transgender identity have been created in the twenty-first century, which examine LGBTIQ topics from a cinematic perspective, among other things. The film 'Flying with One Wing' (2003) depicts the reality of homosexuality in heteronormative Sri Lankan culture, while the film 'Maya' (2016) examines the stigmatisation, stereotypical character, and prejudice towards transgender individuals in Sri Lankan society. "Frangipani," which is also known as "Sayapethi Kusuma" in the local tongue, is a 2013 film that portrays homosexuality as a humanized problem.

Verbal Abuse 

There are a variety of terms used in Sri Lanka to verbally abuse gays; they are based either on their femininity or sexuality. These terms are used with particular intent to directly address gays or to question the heterosexuality or manliness of straight men. 
One of the most common words is "ponnaya." It is slang for transvestites, very effeminate guys, or males who are weak in their interactions with women. "Ponnaya" is also used to indicate that feminized gays who call themselves nachchi are unable to sexually function like "real" men, which is considered disrespectful to both their gender and sexual identity by nachchi. Apart from "ponsi", "samanalaya" (butterfly), and "nangi-malli" (translated to sister-like-brother) are some of the other Sinhala terms used to degrade and discriminate against gay men in Sri Lanka.

Suicide 
Constant violence, discrimination, and alienation result in most gay men in Sri Lanka having suicidal tendencies. According to studies, suicidal thoughts have been shown to be greater among sexual minorities in various Asian nations than in heterosexuals. This occurs against a backdrop of alienation related to society's limited tolerance of social diversity and the perceived burdens felt by these minority groups as a result of their sexual identity. There have been no publications on the psychiatric morbidity of Sri Lankan lgbt individuals in the last decade. Nevertheless, according to the World Health Organization, Sri Lanka had the world's highest age-standardized suicide rate in 2015, with 34.6 suicides per 100,000 people in the population, the highest rate in the world. An unusually high number of suicides and acts of self-harm arise in the setting of interpersonal confrontations and family disagreements. These usually happen on their own and are caused by anger, shame, frustration, and a desire to fight back against what they think is unfair treatment.

Given the societal prejudice that gay people endure in Sri Lanka, it is extremely probable that they face a greater degree of psychological distress and suicidal tendencies. These are infrequently documented in the media as experiences of sexual orientation-related harassment and suicide ideation, as well as being coerced into heterosexual marriages. Furthermore, homophobia is widespread, and families may disavow and expel gays, leading to greater estrangement from society, and they may commit suicide as a result of terrible anguish. The disease paradigm of homosexuality has been abandoned for decades. In Sri Lanka, however, it is not unusual to see parents requesting mental therapy for their children's gay inclination.

See also 
Sexual minorities in Sri Lanka
Tamil sexual minorities

References 

LGBT in Sri Lanka